Sementsevo is a rural locality (a village) in Rostilovskoye Rural Settlement, Gryazovetsky District, Vologda Oblast, Russia. The population was 34 as of 2002.

Geography 
Sementsevo is located 29 km south of Gryazovets (the district's administrative centre) by road. Anosovo is the nearest rural locality.

References 

Rural localities in Gryazovetsky District